Polyonyx is a genus of porcelain crabs in the family Porcellanidae. There are at least 42 described species in Polyonyx.

Species
The species belonging to the genus Polyonyx include the following:
 Polyonyx gibbesi Haig, 1956 (eastern tube crab)
 Polyonyx quadriungulatus Glassell, 1935

References

Further reading

 

Anomura
Decapod genera
Taxa named by William Stimpson
Articles created by Qbugbot